Patrick Henry Taylor (January 2, 1899 – November 1979) was an American Negro league outfielder in the 1920s.

A native of Petersburg, Virginia, Taylor played for the Harrisburg Giants in 1922. He died in Harrisburg, Pennsylvania in 1979 at age 80.

References

External links
Baseball statistics and player information from Baseball-Reference Black Baseball Stats and Seamheads

1899 births
1979 deaths
Harrisburg Giants players
Baseball outfielders
Baseball players from Virginia
Sportspeople from Petersburg, Virginia
20th-century African-American sportspeople